Ebensfeld is a municipality in the district of Lichtenfels in Bavaria in Germany. It lies on the river Main.

Sons and daughters of the town 
 Georg Meixner (1887-1960), German Catholic priest and Bavarian politician 

 Rudolf Lunkenbein (1939-1976), German Salesian and missionary in Brazil
 Johann Andreas Seelmann (1732-1789), was from 1771 until his death Bishop in the Diocese of Speyer
 Johann Baptist Dietz (1879-1959), was a Roman Catholic theologian and 1939-1958 Bishop of the diocese Fulda
 Adam Senger (1860-1935), was auxiliary bishop of Bamberg

References

External links
 

Lichtenfels (district)